The National Trade Unions’ Federation (NTUF) is the sole national trade union center in Libya. It was formed in 1972 and is closely associated with the Libyan regime of Muammar al-Gaddafi.

ICTUR reports that:
No strikes have been reported for many years. According to the government, workers may strike but do not need to because they control their enterprises. External sources, however, reject this assessment.

The NTUF is affiliated with the World Federation of Trade Unions.

References

Trade unions in Libya
World Federation of Trade Unions
International Confederation of Arab Trade Unions
Economy of the Arab League
Trade unions established in 1972